Notable Slovak football transfers in the winter transfer window of the 2021–22 season by club.

Fortuna Liga

ŠK Slovan Bratislava

In:

Out:

FC DAC 1904 Dunajská Streda

In:

Out:

FC Spartak Trnava

In:

Out:

MŠK Žilina

In:

Out:

FC ViOn Zlaté Moravce

In:

Out:

AS Trenčín

In:

Out:

ŠKF Sereď

In:

Out:

MFK Ružomberok

In:

Out:

FK Pohronie

In:

Out:

MFK Zemplín Michalovce

In:

Out:

FK Senica

In:
}

Out:

MFK Tatran Liptovský Mikuláš

In:

Out:

2. liga

MFK Dukla Banská Bystrica

In:

Out:

MFK Skalica

In:

Out:

FK Železiarne Podbrezová

In:

Out:

FC Košice

In:

Out:

FC ŠTK 1914 Šamorín

In:

Out:

MŠK Púchov

In:

Out:

KFC Komárno

In:

Out:

FC Petržalka

In:

Out:

FK Slavoj Trebišov

In:

Out:

FK Dubnica

In:

Out:

MŠK Žilina B

In:

Out:

Partizán Bardejov

In:

Out:

ŠK Slovan Bratislava B

In:

Out:

FK Humenné

In:

Out:

FC Rohožník

In:

Out:

MŠK Námestovo

In:

Out:

References

Transfers
Slovakia
2021-22